Below is the list of populated places in Batman Province, Turkey by the districts. In the following lists first place in each list is the administrative center of the district

Batman
Batman		
Akça, Batman		
Aydınkonak, Batman		
Balpınar, Batman		
Bayraklı, Batman		
Bıçakçı, Batman		
Binatlı, Batman		
Çarıklı, Batman		
Çayüstü, Batman		
Demirbilek, Batman		
Demirlipınar, Batman		
Demiryol, Batman		
Doluca, Batman		
Erköklü, Batman		
Güneşli, Batman		
Güvercin, Batman		
İkiztepe, Batman		
Karayün, Batman		
Kayabağı, Batman		
Kesmeköprü, Batman		
Kösetarla, Batman		
Kuyubaşı, Batman		
Oymataş, Batman		
Recepler, Batman		
Suçeken, Batman		
Yağmurlu, Batman		
Yakıtlı, Batman		
Yaylıca, Batman		
Yediyol, Batman		
Yeniköy, Batman		
Yeşilöz, Batman		
Yolağzı, Batman		
Yolveren, Batman

Beşiri
 Beşiri		
 Alaca, Beşiri		
 Asmadere, Beşiri		
 Atbağı, Beşiri		
 Ayrancı, Beşiri		
 Bahçeli, Beşiri		
 Başarı, Beşiri		
 Beşpınar, Beşiri		
 Beyçayırı, Beşiri		
 Bilek, Beşiri		
 Çakıllı, Beşiri		
 Çavuşbayırı, Beşiri		
 Çevrimova, Beşiri		
 Çığırlı, Beşiri		
 Dağyolu, Beşiri		
 Danalı, Beşiri		
 Dayılar, Beşiri		
 Değirmenüstü, Beşiri		
 Deveboynu, Beşiri		
 Doğankavak, Beşiri		
 Doğanpazarı, Beşiri		
 Durucak, Beşiri		
 Esence, Beşiri		
 Eskihamur, Beşiri		
 Güvercinlik, Beşiri		
 Ilıca, Beşiri		
 Işıkveren, Beşiri
 İkiköprü, Beşiri		
 İkiyaka, Beşiri		
 İnpınar, Beşiri		
 Kaşüstü, Beşiri		
 Kayatepe, Beşiri		
 Kumçay, Beşiri		
 Kumgeçit, Beşiri		
 Kurukavak, Beşiri		
 Kuşçukuru, Beşiri		
 Kütüklü, Beşiri		
 Oğuz, Beşiri		
 Otluca, Beşiri		
 Örmegöze, Beşiri		
 Samanlı, Beşiri		
 Tepecik, Beşiri		
 Uğurca, Beşiri		
 Üçkuyular, Beşiri		
 Yakacık, Beşiri		
 Yalınca, Beşiri		
 Yalınkavak, Beşiri		
 Yarımtaş, Beşiri		
 Yazıhan, Beşiri		
 Yenipınar, Beşiri		
 Yeniyol, Beşiri		
 Yeşiloba, Beşiri		
 Yolkonak, Beşiri		
 Yontukyazı, Beşiri

Gercüş 

 Gercüş		
 Akburç, Gercüş		
 Akyar, Gercüş		
 Ardıç, Gercüş		
 Ardıçlı, Gercüş		
 Arıca, Gercüş		
 Aydınca, Gercüş		
 Aydınlı, Gercüş		
 Bağlıca, Gercüş		
 Bağözü, Gercüş		
 Başarköy, Gercüş		
 Başova, Gercüş		
 Boğazköy, Gercüş		
 Çalışkan, Gercüş		
 Çiçekli, Gercüş		
 Çukuryurt, Gercüş		
 Dereiçi, Gercüş		
 Dereli, Gercüş		
 Doruk, Gercüş		
 Düzmeşe, Gercüş		
 Eymir, Gercüş		
 Geçit, Gercüş		
 Gökçe, Gercüş		
 Gökçepınar, Gercüş		
 Gönüllü, Gercüş		
 Gürbüz, Gercüş		
 Güzelöz, Gercüş		
 Hisar, Gercüş		
 Kantar, Gercüş		
 Karalan, Gercüş		
 Kayalar, Gercüş		
 Kayapınar, Gercüş		
 Kesiksu, Gercüş		
 Kırkat, Gercüş		
 Kışlak, Gercüş		
 Koçak, Gercüş		
 Koyunlu, Gercüş		
 Kozlu, Gercüş		
 Kömürcü, Gercüş		
 Kutlu, Gercüş		
 Nurlu, Gercüş		
 Özler, Gercüş		
 Poyraz, Gercüş		
 Rüzgarlı, Gercüş		
 Sargın, Gercüş		
 Seki, Gercüş		
 Serinköy, Gercüş		
 Taşçı, Gercüş		
 Tepecik, Gercüş		
 Ulaş, Gercüş		
 Vergili, Gercüş		
 Yakıtlı, Gercüş		
 Yamanlar, Gercüş		
 Yassıca, Gercüş		
 Yayladüzü, Gercüş		
 Yemişli, Gercüş		
 Yenice, Gercüş		
 Yolağzı, Gercüş		
 Yüceköy, Gercüş

Hasankeyf 

 Hasankeyf		
 Akalın, Hasankeyf		
 Aksu, Hasankeyf		
 Bayırlı, Hasankeyf		
 Büyükdere, Hasankeyf		
 Çardaklı, Hasankeyf		
 Irmak, Hasankeyf		
 İncirli, Hasankeyf		
 Karaköy, Hasankeyf		
 Kumluca, Hasankeyf		
 Öğütlü, Hasankeyf		
 Saklı, Hasankeyf		
 Soğucak, Hasankeyf		
 Tepebaşı, Hasankeyf		
 Uzundere, Hasankeyf		
 Üçyol, Hasankeyf		
 Yakaköy, Hasankeyf		
 Yolüstü, Hasankeyf

Kozluk
 Kozluk		
 Akçakışla, Kozluk		
 Akçalı, Kozluk		
 Alıçlı, Kozluk		
 Arıkaya, Kozluk		
 Armutlu, Kozluk		
 Aşağıkıratlı, Kozluk		
 Bekirhan, Kozluk		
 Beşkonak, Kozluk		
 Beybağı, Kozluk		
 Bölükkonak, Kozluk		
 Çamlıca, Kozluk		
 Çaygeçit, Kozluk		
 Çayhan, Kozluk		
 Çayönü, Kozluk		
 Çevrecik, Kozluk		
 Danagözü, Kozluk		
 Dere, Kozluk		
 Derince, Kozluk		
 Dövecik, Kozluk		
 Duygulu, Kozluk		
 Eskice, Kozluk		
 Geçitaltı, Kozluk		
 Geyikli, Kozluk		
 Güllüce, Kozluk		
 Gümüşörgü, Kozluk		
 Gündüzlü, Kozluk		
 Günyayla, Kozluk		
 Gürpınar, Kozluk		
 İnişli, Kozluk		
 Kaletepe, Kozluk		
 Kamışlı, Kozluk		
 Karaoğlak, Kozluk		
 Karpuzlu, Kozluk		
 Karşıyaka, Kozluk		
 Kavakdibi, Kozluk		
 Kayadibi, Kozluk		
 Koçaklar, Kozluk		
 Konaklı, Kozluk		
 Kulludere, Kozluk		
 Kumlupınar, Kozluk		
 Ortaca, Kozluk		
 Ortaçay, Kozluk		
 Oyuktaş, Kozluk		
 Örensu, Kozluk		
 Parmakkapı, Kozluk		
 Pınarhisar, Kozluk		
 Samanyolu, Kozluk		
 Seyitler, Kozluk		
 Seyrantepe, Kozluk		
 Taşlıdere, Kozluk		
 Taşlık, Kozluk		
 Tosunpınar, Kozluk		
 Tuzlagözü, Kozluk		
 Ulaşlı, Kozluk		
 Uzunçayır, Kozluk		
 Uzunyazı, Kozluk		
 Ünsaldı, Kozluk		
 Yanıkkaya, Kozluk		
 Yankılı, Kozluk		
 Yapaklı, Kozluk		
 Yayalar, Kozluk		
 Yazılı, Kozluk		
 Yazpınar, Kozluk		
 Yedibölük, Kozluk		
 Yeniçağlar, Kozluk		
 Yenidağan, Kozluk		
 Yenidoğan, Kozluk		
 Yıldızlı, Kozluk		
 Yukarıkıratlı, Kozluk		
 Ziyaret, Kozluk

Sason
 Sason		
 Acar, Sason		
 Altındere, Sason		
 Aydınlık, Sason		
 Balbaşı, Sason		
 Binekli, Sason		
 Cevizli, Sason		
 Çağlı, Sason		
 Çakırpınar, Sason		
 Çalışırlar, Sason		
 Çayırlı, Sason		
 Çınarlı, Sason		
 Dağçatı, Sason		
 Dereiçi, Sason		
 Dereköy, Sason		
 Derince, Sason		
 Dikbayır, Sason		
 Dörtbölük, Sason		
 Ergünü, Sason		
 Erikli, Sason		
 Geçitli, Sason		
 Günlüce, Sason		
 Gürgenli, Sason		
 Güvercinlik, Sason		
 Heybeli, Sason		
 İncesu, Sason		
 Kaleyolu, Sason		
 Karameşe, Sason		
 Kaşyayla, Sason		
 Kavaklı, Sason		
 Kayadüzü, Sason		
 Kelhasan, Sason		
 Kınalı, Sason		
 Kilimli, Sason		
 Koçkaya, Sason		
 Köprübaşı, Sason		
 Meşeli, Sason		
 Örenağıl, Sason		
 Sarıyayla, Sason		
 Soğanlı, Sason		
 Taşyuva, Sason		
 Umurlu, Sason		
 Yakabağ, Sason		
 Yeniköy, Sason		
 Yiğitler, Sason		
 Yolüstü, Sason		
 Yuvalar, Sason		
 Yücebağ, Sason		
 Yürekli, Sason

References

Batman Province
Batman Province
List